David Fernández is a table tennis player from Puerto Rico, champion in the singles event of the 2002 Central American and Caribbean Games, silver medallist in mixed doubles, playing with Glenda Reyes and bronze in team competition alongside Juan Revelles, Santiago Coste and Abner Colón.

In 2008 he defeated 4-2 Sydney Christophe in the semifinals of the Brooklyn Open table tennis tournament, before falling to Guyanese Paul David in the final.

References

Year of birth missing (living people)
Living people
Puerto Rican table tennis players
Place of birth missing (living people)
Central American and Caribbean Games gold medalists for Puerto Rico
Central American and Caribbean Games silver medalists for Puerto Rico
Central American and Caribbean Games bronze medalists for Puerto Rico
Competitors at the 2002 Central American and Caribbean Games
Central American and Caribbean Games medalists in table tennis